The Ohio–Pennsylvania League (1905–1912) was a Class C and Class D level minor league baseball league that featured franchises based in Ohio, Pennsylvania, and West Virginia. The league was founded by Charlie Morton and operated for eight seasons, with the Akron Champs winning four league championships.

History

The Ohio–Pennsylvania League had its beginnings in March 1905, when league president Charlie Morton invited six prospective members to a meeting in Akron, Ohio. In May 1905, eleven teams joined the Protective Association of Independent Clubs, which formed the basis of the Class C Division Ohio–Pennsylvania League. Ultimately, the league trimmed down to eight teams from the following cities: Akron, Newark, Niles, Youngstown, and Zanesville in Ohio, and Homestead, Lancaster, and Sharon in Pennsylvania.

That September, the Youngstown Ohio Works won the league championship, although sources disagree on the team's final record. As one researcher writes: "The Reach Guide (1906) credits Youngstown with an 84–32 won-lost record where the Spalding Guide of the same year lists a 90–35 record. The Encyclopedia of Minor League Baseball (1993) tells a third story, giving Youngstown an 88–35 mark."

In 1912, the league rescinded its membership in the National Association when it placed a franchise in Pittsburgh, Pennsylvania.

By the end of its seven-year lifespan, in 1912, the Ohio–Pennsylvania League had enlisted the membership of no less than 40 ball clubs based in over 20 cities. While the league was disorganized (like many of its counterparts), it provided regional sports teams with an alternative to the established minor-league system. Baseball luminaries who were once connected to the league include Billy Evans, Lee Fohl, Bill Phyle, and Everett Scott. Future Hall-of-Fame infielder George Sisler signed his first professional contract with an Akron club associated with the O-P League, although he never actually played for the team.

Cities represented

Akron, OH: Akron Buckeyes 1905; Akron Rubbernecks 1906; Akron Champs 1907–1911
Alliance, OH & Sebring, OH: Alliance-Sebring Twins 1912
Barberton, OH: Barberton Magic Cities 1905
Braddock, PA: Braddock Infants 1905
Bridgeport, OH: Bridgeport Giants 1912
Bucyrus, OH: Bucyrus Bucks 1905
Butler, PA: Butler Bucks 1905; Butler 1908 
Canton, OH: Canton Protectives 1905 Canton Watchmakers 1908–1909; Canton Deubers 1910–1911
Connellsville, PA: Connellsville Cokers 1912
East Liverpool, OH: East Liverpool Potters 1908–1912
Erie, PA: Erie Sailors 1908–1911 
Fairmont, WV: Fairmont Fairies 1912 
Girard, OH: Girard Sailors 1908 
Homestead, PA: Homestead Steel Workers 1905 
Kent, OH: Kent Kings 1905
Lancaster, OH: Lancaster Lanks 1905–1907
Lima, OH: Lima Lees 1905
Mansfield, OH: Mansfield Giants 1906; Mansfield Pioneers 1907; Mansfield Reformers 1910; Mansfield Brownies 1911  
Marion, OH: Marion Moguls 1906; Marion Drummers 1907 
Massillon, OH: Massillon Farmers 1905
McKeesport, PA: McKeesport Colts 1905; McKeesport Tubers 1908–1910; McKeesport Tubers 1912
Mount Vernon, OH: Mount Vernon Clippers 1905
New Castle, PA: New Castle Outlaws 1906; New Castle Nocks 1907–1912
New Martinsville, WV:New Martinsville 1912
Newark, OH: Newark Idlewilds 1905; Newark Cotton Tops 1906; Newark Newks 1907
Niles, OH: Niles Crowites 1905
Pittsburgh, PA: Pittsburgh 1912
Salem, OH: Salem Quakers 1912 
Sharon, PA: Sharon Steels 1905–1906; Sharon Giants 1907–1908, 1912; Sharon Travelers 1911 
Steubenville, OH: Steubenville Factory Men 1905; Steubenville Stubs 1909, 1911 
Steubenville, OH & Follansbee, WV: Steubenville-Follansbee Stubs 1912
Washington, PA: Washington Patriots 1905
Wooster, OH: Wooster Trailers 1905 
Youngstown, OH: Youngstown Ohio Works 1905–1906; Youngstown Champs 1907–1908; Youngstown Indians 1909; Youngstown Steelmen 1910–1911 
Zanesville, OH: Zanesville Moguls 1905–1906

League champions
Youngstown Ohio Works (1905)
Youngstown Ohio Works (1906)
Youngstown Champs (1907)
Akron Champs (1908)
Akron Champs (1909)
Akron Champs (1910)
Akron Champs (1911)
Salem Quakers & Fairmont Fairies (1912)

Standings and statistics

1905 to 1908
1905 Ohio–Pennsylvania League
League was admitted to the National Association July 21Canton withdrew July 10; Kent withdrew July 31; Butler withdrew Aug 2; Steubenville withdrew Aug 2; Mt. Vernon withdrew Aug 12; Massillon withdrew Aug 24. 
1906 Ohio–Pennsylvania League
schedule
Zanesville (58–55) moved to Marion August 28.No playoffs were scheduled. 

 
1907 Ohio–Pennsylvania League
schedule
 No playoffs were scheduled. 

1908 Ohio–Pennsylvania League
schedule
 # Girard (0–9) moved to Butler May 9; Butler (5–17) moved to Erie June 15. The season was shortened to September 7. No playoffs were scheduled.

1909 to 1912
1909 Ohio–Pennsylvania League
schedule
 No playoffs were scheduled. 

1910 Ohio–Pennsylvania League
schedule
 No playoffs were scheduled. 

1911 Ohio–Pennsylvania League
schedule
 New Castle (25–85) moved to Sharon August 12. East Liverpool and Steubenville disbanded August 20. No playoffs were scheduled. 

1912 Ohio–Pennsylvania League
schedule
 Connelsville and New Castle disbanded June 18; Salem moved to Fairmont July 9; Alliance-Sebring disbanded July 15 due to a player strike; McKeesport disbanded July 17; Sharon moved to Bridgeport August 10; East Liverpool moved to Pittsburgh (2–0) August 14, then to New Martinsville August 18. The league rescinded its membership to the National Association August 13 when it placed a franchise in Pittsburgh. Playoff: Fairmont was declared champion when Steubenville-Follansbee was unable to field a team for the playoffs.

References

Related links
Ballpark Watch
Baseball Reference
Ohio–Pennsylvania League history

Baseball leagues in Pennsylvania
Baseball leagues in Ohio
Defunct minor baseball leagues in the United States
Sports leagues established in 1905
Sports leagues disestablished in 1912
Baseball leagues in West Virginia